Sumire is a feminine Japanese given name.

Sumire may also refer to:

Sumire, the common Japanese name of Viola mandshurica
"Sumire", a 2003 song on the Japanese band Yuzu
"Sumire", a song on The Gazette's 2004 album Madara
Sumire, the project code name of the Sony Xperia Z5 smartphone
Japanese destroyer Sumire, two ships of the Imperial Japanese Navy

People with the surname
María Sumire, Peruvian politician and member of Union for Peru party

See also
"Sumire September Love", a 1982 song by Ippu-Do, covered by Shazna in 1997 and Megamasso in 2011
Sumire 16 sai!!, a Japanese manga and TV drama series